Vanger Conceição da Silva (born 27 January 1987 in São Luís), or simply Vanger, is a Brazilian professional footballer who plays as a midfielder for Tupynambás.

Club career
Vanger began his professional career with Centro Atlético Fénix in Uruguay, before joined Belgium club C.S. Visé in 2009.

In January 2012, Vanger joined Horizonte Futebol Clube. For four months he earned 19 appearances in the Campeonato Cearense, scored 7 goals.

In May 2012, Vanger signed for Campeonato Brasileiro Série B side Boa Esporte Clube. He made his debut in a 2–2 draw against Avaí on 19 May, playing the full 90 minutes. On 24 June, Vanger scored his first goal in a 4–1 win over Grêmio Barueri at Melão. He ended the season with 6 goals in 34 league games.
 
On 8 January 2013, it was officially announced that Vanger had signed a contract with Litex Lovech in Bulgaria.

Career statistics

References

External links

Profile at footgoal.net

1987 births
Living people
Brazilian footballers
Brazilian expatriate footballers
Expatriate footballers in Belgium
Expatriate footballers in Bulgaria
Centro Atlético Fénix players
C.S. Visé players
Alecrim Futebol Clube players
Horizonte Futebol Clube players
Boa Esporte Clube players
PFC Litex Lovech players
Tombense Futebol Clube players
Associação Desportiva Recreativa e Cultural Icasa players
São Bernardo Futebol Clube players
Sampaio Corrêa Futebol Clube players
Cuiabá Esporte Clube players
Campinense Clube players
Uberlândia Esporte Clube players
Centro Sportivo Alagoano players
Globo Futebol Clube players
Tupynambás Futebol Clube players
Treze Futebol Clube players
Uruguayan Primera División players
Uruguayan Segunda División players
First Professional Football League (Bulgaria) players
Campeonato Brasileiro Série B players
Campeonato Brasileiro Série C players
Campeonato Brasileiro Série D players
Association football midfielders